Linua is an island in the Torres Islands archipelago in Torba Province of Vanuatu in the southwestern Pacific Ocean.

Geography
Linua has a length of 2.8 km and diameter of 1 km. 
The estimated terrain elevation above sea level is 23 meters. Linua lies about 60 miles (100 km) north of Espiritu Santo Island between islands of Tegua and Lo. The island is surrounded by coral reefs.  There is an airstrip on the island opened in 1983 that provides the only regular transportation flights with the rest of Vanuatu.

The island is used mostly in times of plane landing, and is not settled permanently; the people there are based in the neighbouring village of Lungharegi, on Lo island. Linua has a small tourist hamlet, Kamilisa, consisting of four bungalows and a capacity of up to 20 people.

Climate
Linua has a tropical rainforest climate (Af) with very heavy rainfall year-round.

Name
The island is locally called Linue  in Lo-Toga. The official name Linua  is spelled according to the Mota language, which missionaries chose as a reference in the area; the latter form is conservative of the ancient form *linua which can be reconstructed in the ancestral language of the Torres and Banks Islands.

References

Torba Province
Islands of Vanuatu
Archipelagoes of the Pacific Ocean